Adenine Agbejule (born 15 December 1981) is a Nigerian retired footballer.

Career

Finland

Acquired by Vaasan Palloseura in 2001, Agbejule landed on September 2, exercising with them and seized his first goal to salvage a point at Haka.

Poland

Assisting and scoring once as Hutnik Warsaw got past Jagiellonia Białystok 2-0 midway through 2001, the wideman was assaulted by the opposition's supporters who were apoplectic when the game was over, forcing him to retreat to the locker room. Despite taking the case to the Białystok authorities, they were unable to determine which of the hooligans committed the crime so the search was discontinued, with nobody being prosecuted.

References 

1981 births
Living people
Nigerian footballers
Association football forwards
Veikkausliiga players
Vaasan Palloseura players
Nigerian expatriate footballers
Expatriate footballers in Poland
Expatriate footballers in Finland
Yoruba sportspeople
Nigerian sportsmen